Emiliano David Ibarra (born 20 January 1982 in Carcarañá) is an Argentine cyclist, who currently rides for UCI Continental team .

Major results
2016
 2nd Time trial, National Road Championships
2017
 2nd Time trial, National Road Championships
2018
 1st  Time trial, National Road Championships
 5th Time trial, Pan American Road Championships
2019
 2nd Time trial, National Road Championships
2022
 4th Time trial, National Road Championships
2023
 7th Overall Giro del Sol
1st Stage 1

References

External links

1982 births
Living people
Argentine male cyclists
Sportspeople from Santa Fe Province
21st-century Argentine people